Norwalk High School is a public high school in Norwalk, Ohio.  It is the only public high school in the Norwalk City Schools district.  The school was established in 1857 and the nickname of the school is the Truckers.

Location
Norwalk High School is located at 350 Shady Lane and serves students in grades 9-12. Having an enrollment of approximately 800 students with about 100 of them attending EHOVE Career Center, the school has a staff of 40 teachers, 2 guidance counselors, a principal, an assistant principal and full-time or part-time support staff and teaching specialists.

Norwalk High has been accredited with North Central Association since 1912.   Norwalk High is proud of its curriculum. It offers 110 course offerings in college preparatory, business, vocational, home economics, industrial arts, general courses, learning disabilities classes, Advanced Placement and tutoring. The high school also offers advanced placement courses in English, American History, U.S. Government, Calculus, Biology, French, Spanish, and Computer Science. Honors classes are also offered in English, Geometry and Algebra II. The music program includes marching band, orchestra, concert band, wind ensemble, and choir.

Activities
Norwalk High offers a wide variety of extra-curricular activities for students from sports to clubs. These include:

Sports
Football, Volleyball, Golf, Boys' & Girls' Tennis, Cross Country, Track, Softball, Baseball, Wrestling, Boys' & Girls' Bowling, Boys' & Girls' Basketball, Soccer and Swimming.

A long time member of the Northern Ohio League (1944-2017), Norwalk joined the Sandusky Bay Conference in 2017.

Clubs
Art, Student Council, World Language, Blue Squad (Recycling), Key Club, FCCLA, Book Club, Focus 4:12, Firelands (Academic) Challenge, N.E.R.D Nation, Chess Club, Hacky Sack Club, and Debate Club.

Blue Pride Marching Band

The Blue Pride Marching Band performs at all football games.
The band is currently under the direction of Mr. Will Kish and Assistant Director Ms. Melissa d'Aliberti. The band is open to all students grades 9-12. 

In addition to the above activities, NHS. also provides: Fall, Winter and Spring Sports Awards, Academic Awards, Academic Hall of Excellence, Student of the Month, Underclassman Awards Recognition, Senior Awards Banquet,Winter & Spring Band, and Orchestra & Choir concerts.

Ohio High School Athletic Association State Championships

Championships
 Boys Football, Class AA – 1974 
 Boys Volleyball - 1989 (unsanctioned) 
 Boys Basketball, Division II  – 2014 State Champions
 Girls Volleyball, Division II - 2012 Runners Up 
 Boys Track and Field 4 × 800 m Relay, Division 1 - 2014 Runners Up

The Trucker Imprint
The Norwalk High School student newspaper is the Trucker Imprint.  The paper (when first published was called the Signal) was published around the start of the 20th century until it was discontinued in the early 1980s.  During the 1993–1994 school year, The N.H.S. Underground was founded and produced four editions but folded amidst the district's continued budget deficits of the mid-1990s. The paper was introduced again to the high school when it moved to its new location at 350 Shady Lane in 2001.

References

External links
 District Website

High schools in Huron County, Ohio
Public high schools in Ohio
1857 establishments in Ohio
Norwalk, Ohio